Nienhagen is a municipality  in the Rostock district, in Mecklenburg-Vorpommern, Germany.

Geography 

The municipality lies on the Baltic Sea coast between the oldest German seaside spa of Heiligendamm and Warnemünde. Large parts of the municipal territory are forested. This mixed forest is circa  in area and is called Ghost Wood (Gespensterwald) by the locals. The beech trees, in particular, have been shaped by the sea winds, grow mainly on one side and have twisted, snake-like branches, which gives them a ghostly appearance especially at twilight and in the mist.

A footpath with coastal views runs immediately behind the sea cliffs to Börgerende. Below the cliffs are beaches of fine sand, suitable for bathing, piles of scree and several large glacial erratics. A mile off the coast in the Baltic Sea is Nienhagen Artificial Reef which is used for research.

References

External links 

Populated coastal places in Germany (Baltic Sea)